David Carll (October 9, 1830 –December 27, 1888) was a 19th-century American shipbuilder. He was well known for building fast and seaworthy yachts and schooners. He specialized in shallow draft Centreboard schooners. The David Carll's shipyard was the first commercial shipyard built in City Island. He built the popular schooners David Carll, Vesta, Resolute, and Ambassadress. His brother, Jesse Carll had a successful shipyard in Northport, New York.

Early life

David Carll was born in Northport, New York, on October 9, 1830. He was the son of Jesse E. Carll, Jr., and Susan Scudder Smith. He had two brothers, Jesse and Henry Carll. He married Hannah Amelia Denton in 1861 at Christ's First Presbyterian Church, Nassau County, New York. They had three daughters Susie D. Rich, Minnie Estelle Harrington, Jesse Anita Carll and one son David Carll Jr. Carll was a founding member of Jephtha Masonic Lodge No. 494 in Huntington, New York, along with his brother Jesse Carll in 1860.

Career

Carll was well known for building fast and seaworthy yachts and schooners. He specialized in shallow draft Centreboard schooners. David Carll's shipyard was the first commercial shipyard built in City Island. He built the popular schooners Vesta, Resolute, and Ambassadress.

In 1849, Carll and his brother apprenticed under James and Lloyd Bayles shipbuilders of Port Jefferson, New York. In 1854, Carll and his brother Jesse Carll, began shipbuilding in Northport, off Woodbine Avenue, under the firm name D & J. Carl.

David and Jesse built the bark Storm Bird, which put them into debt. They dissolved the partnership in 1865. His brother, Jesse Carll continued with a shipyard under the name Jesse Carll and built yachts, pilot-boats and brigs, including the bark Mary Greenwood, the Joseph Rudd, and the pilot-boat Jesse Carll. David Carll continued with his shipyard until he retired in 1885. In the 1870s, David purchased an orange plantation near Crescent City, Florida, and planted more than sixty thousand trees.

In 1859, Carll moved from Northport and bought out and enlarged the shipyard started by Samuel P. Hart in City Island, Bronx, at the East End of Pilot Avenue. In 1859, he built a 37-foot sloop Bell for James Sackett at City Island. He built many boats, such as the schooner Wm H. Van Name (1872), pilot boat David Carll (1876) and the yachts Vesta, (1865) and Resolute, (1871). The  Resolute, was renamed the Ramona. In 1863, David Carll more acres of land a wharf in 1865. The Vesta was modeled and built by David Carll for the tobacco heir Pierre Lorillard in 1866. She was in the great ocean race in 1866, against the Henrietta and Fleetwing.

In October 1867, Carll purchased the US battleship USS North Carolina, and used the oak timbers to build the schooner yacht Resolute, for A. S. Hatchand, the first City Island bridge (1873) from City Island to Rodman Neck in Pelham, New York.

He also did the alterations for the schooner yacht Sappho (1867). He built the yachts: Ambassadress (1877), Nirvana (1884), Atalanta (1873), Vega Reindeer (1873), Stephen D. Barnes (1875), LV 39 (1875), William H. Bailey (1878), Samuel S. Thorp (1881), Mollie J. Saunders (1883), Sue Williams (1883), and Vesta; the sloops: Gracie (1878), Phebe and Lurline; and the Magic for Franklin Osgood.

In 1864, David Carll served as an Elders of the Second Presbyterian Church of Huntington. He was a member and Vestryman of the Grace Episcopal Church in City Island for over twenty five years. His brother, Jesse, died on October 24, 1902, in Northport, New York, at 72 years old.

In 1869, the yacht Magic was taken to City Island where it was rebuilt by David Carll as a centerboard schooner yacht for Franklin Osgood. In 1870, the yacht Magic became the first defender of the 1870 America's Cup. The Atlanta was built in 1873 for William Backhouse Astor. The steam powered Henry A. Peck tugboat (1882). In 1884, the sloop Julia, built by George Steers in 1854, was completely rebuilt as a schooner yacht and renamed Nirvana, by the Carll shipyard for Commodore Edward Brown of New York Yacht Club.

On May 21, 1872, Vice-Commodore John S. Dickerson of the Brooklyn Yacht Club took the schooner-yacht Fleur de Lis to be fitted out by David Carll. She also got an entire suit of canvass by J. M. Sawyer. Alterations were completed on June 10, 1872.

Death

David Carll died on December 27, 1888, at the age of 62 at his plantation, near Crescent City, Florida. His widow, Hannah, sold the shipyard to Henry Piepgrass, who continued the shipyard until 1900, when he sold it to the Robert Jacob shipyard (1900-1946); then to the Consolidated Shipbuilding (1946-1958) and Consolidated Yachts (1958–present).

See also

 List of Northeastern U. S. Pilot Boats

References

People from Northport, New York
1888 deaths
American shipbuilders
1830 births